Gharaunda is a town and a municipal committee  in Karnal district  in the state of Haryana, India. It is situated at a distance of sixty-five miles to the northwest of New Delhi. It is eleven miles from Karnal, the district headquarters. The Amritsar-Delhi main broad-gauge railway line passes through the town. Indo-Israel Centre For Excellence in Vegetables and one of the leading footwear industries of India 'Liberty Shoes' has its manufacturing unit in Gharaunda. This has given fame to the place. Gharaunda serves as a big Grain market for the state.

Geography
It has an average elevation of 213 metres (698 feet). The municipal area of the town is 4.37 km² which does not include the existing and proposed area to be developed by Haryana Urban Development Authority under any town and country planning scheme.

Demographics
 India census, Gharaunda had a population of 37,816. Males constitute 52.67% of the population and females 47.32%. Gharaunda has an average literacy rate of 81.1%, higher than the national average of 74.04%: male literacy is 87.3%, and female literacy is 74.2%. In Gharaunda, 13.21% of the population is under 6 years of age. Rajput is main community in Gharaunda. Hindus are 94% of the total population and are the largest religious community in the city followed by Sikhs which contribute 4% of the total population and Jains are the third largest religious community with 1% population.

History

Being on the Grand Trunk Road, it is a historic place with several historic monuments, such as Gharaunda Mughal Sarai Gateway and Kos Minar along the Grand Trunk Road .

Mughal sarai 
The Sarai (rest house) was built in 1637 AD during the reign of Mughal Emperor Shah Jahan.  The sarai is quadrangular in shape with cells on all four sides. Existing gateways form a part of northern and southern walls and they both have three stories and are made of lakhaur bricks. It is decorated with panels, balconies, rounded towers and angular flutes.

References

Cities and towns in Karnal district